Viktor Vasilyevich Grishin (– 25 May 1992) was a Soviet politician. He was a candidate (1961–1971) and full member (1971–1986) of the Politburo of the Central Committee of the Communist Party of the Soviet Union.

Grishin was born in Serpukhov, in the Moscow Governorate of the Russian Empire. In his early years, he worked on the Moscovy railroad, as a spike driver who retrofitted its railway system. He served in the Red Army from 1938 until 1940. In 1941, he was a Communist party functionary. He eventually rose to become leader of the Communist party in the city of Moscow from 1967 until 1985. He was renowned for his hardline stance.

During the final months of Konstantin Chernenko's life, Grishin had been considered as a possible contender to succeed Chernenko as General Secretary, and as a possible alternative to Mikhail Gorbachev. In an attempt to stress his closeness to Chernenko, he dragged the terminally ill Soviet leader out to vote in early 1985. This action by Grishin backfired and was almost universally viewed as a cruel act. After Chernenko's death in March 1985, he declined to put himself forward as a candidate for succession and instead offered his support, albeit lukewarm, to Gorbachev. Gorbachev was subsequently unanimously elected as the General Secretary.

In late-December 1985, Grishin was replaced by Boris Yeltsin as the First Secretary of the Moscow  party committee. On 18 February 1986, Grishin lost his position as a member of the Politburo.

In a 1991 interview with the conservative Russian newspaper Molodaya Gvardiya, he claimed the only reason he lost was because "younger Party leaders, such as Yegor Ligachev, supported Gorbachev because they feared that if I had become Party boss, they would lose their posts."

On 25 May 1992, Grishin died at the age of 77. He suffered a heart attack at a welfare office in Moscow, where he went to register an increase in his state pension.

References

External links 
 Archie Brown, The Gorbachev Factor.  Oxford University Press, 1997. 
 Viktor Grishin, Ex-Moscow Party Chief, Dies at 77. New York Times, 27 May 1992. Accessed 14 December 2009.

1914 births
1992 deaths
People from Serpukhov
People from Serpukhovsky Uyezd
Politburo of the Central Committee of the Communist Party of the Soviet Union members
Presidium of the Supreme Soviet
Third convocation members of the Supreme Soviet of the Soviet Union
Fourth convocation members of the Soviet of the Union
Fifth convocation members of the Soviet of the Union
Sixth convocation members of the Soviet of the Union
Seventh convocation members of the Soviet of the Union
Eighth convocation members of the Soviet of the Union
Ninth convocation members of the Soviet of the Union
Tenth convocation members of the Soviet of the Union
Eleventh convocation members of the Soviet of the Union
Heroes of Socialist Labour
Recipients of the Order of Lenin
Recipients of the Order of Friendship of Peoples
Burials at Novodevichy Cemetery